Dean William Macpherson (born 2 February 1985) is a South African Member of Parliament for the Official Opposition, the Democratic Alliance and Provincial Chairperson in KwaZulu-Natal. He served his first full term in the National Assembly from 2014 - 2019 and was re-elected to the National Assembly on 8 May 2019 to begin his second term.

On the 27th of March 2021, he was elected as the Chairperson of the Democratic Alliance in KwaZulu-Natal.

In 2020, he had a 64% committee attendance rate as a Member of Parliament (30 meetings out of 47).

He was the Shadow Deputy Minister for Trade and Industry from 2014 to 2017 before being promoted to Shadow Minister for Trade and Industry from 2017 - 2019.

Macpherson is from Durban, Kwa-Zulu Natal and currently resides in Umhlanga.

From 2009 to 2014, Macpherson was the elected Ward Councillor for Durban North in the eThekwini Municipality where he served as the Chief Whip of the party until 2013.

Controversy 
On 7 October 2021, Macpherson issued a statement apologizing and explaining his role in the controversial creation and placement of "racist" posters ahead of South Africa's 2021 Local Government Election.

The two posters read in order "The ANC called you racists" and "The DA calls you heroes" and were erected in Phoenix, KwaZulu-Natal. Phoenix was a hotspot for violence and racial tension during the 2021 South African unrest with 36 people losing their lives during looting and acts of vigilantism that was largely based on racial profiling.

Ntwenhle Mhlongo, the mother of Sanele Mngomezulu, one of the victims who was killed in Phoenix, said they felt insulted by the DA's campaign in an interview with Radio 702:"As one of the Phoenix massacre victims, we feel so insulted by what the DA is saying... How can you call someone a hero, someone who just murdered someone in cold blood, who had no weapon?"

"As far as I know, a hero is someone who is saving the world, who is saving someone, who is protecting someone. How can you call a murderer a hero?"In his statement, Macpherson admitted the posters were "unsanctioned" by the DA's leadership or party structures and arranged for the removal of the posters. He apologized for his role in the controversy by saying "...the posters have regretfully caused hurt to some people. I am deeply sorry and apologise for this."

Macpherson was further criticized in the media. Crispin Hemson, director at the International Centre of Non-violence at the Durban University of Technology, said the DA had exploited the situation.

An editorial in the Mail & Guardian labelled Macpherson as "The poster boy for whiteness" and another article published by News24 claimed many people within Macpherson's own party objected to the posters and said that the controversy had caused a "DA revolt" with "guns blazing for Macpherson" over the issue.

The ANC's provincial spokesperson Nhlakanipho Ntombela criticized the poster campaign and said, “The ANC calls on the citizens to strive to end racial exploitation by the DA that plays with their emotions."

The ANC's deputy secretary-general Jessie Duarte welcomed the removal of the posters but said her party would still lay an official complaint with the South African Human Rights Commission (SAHRC). Duarte told journalists during a visit to Phoenix on 7 October 2021: “This is what we must undo, and it has given the perception that racism is okay and vigilantism is okay. The message as resonated will not go away easily. So, taking the posters down is a good thing but we will go ahead with the Human Rights Commission complaint.”

References

External links 

 Parliament biography
Twitter
DeanMacphersonMP/ on Facebook

Living people
1985 births
Democratic Alliance (South Africa) politicians
Members of the National Assembly of South Africa
People from Durban
People from KwaZulu-Natal
Politicians from KwaZulu-Natal